Krasnaya Polyana meaning "Red Meadow" is the name of several inhabited localities in Russia:

Modern localities

Amur Oblast
As of 2012, one rural locality in Amur Oblast bears this name:
Krasnaya Polyana, Amur Oblast, a selo in Tomsky Rural Settlement of Seryshevsky District

Republic of Bashkortostan
As of 2012, one rural locality in the Republic of Bashkortostan bears this name:
Krasnaya Polyana, Republic of Bashkortostan, a village in Mikyashevsky Selsoviet of Davlekanovsky District

Belgorod Oblast
As of 2012, three rural localities in Belgorod Oblast bear this name:
Krasnaya Polyana, Chernyansky District, Belgorod Oblast, a settlement in Chernyansky District
Krasnaya Polyana, Ivnyansky District, Belgorod Oblast, a khutor in Ivnyansky District
Krasnaya Polyana, Shebekinsky District, Belgorod Oblast, a selo in Shebekinsky District

Bryansk Oblast
As of 2012, two rural localities in Bryansk Oblast bear this name:
Krasnaya Polyana, Karachevsky District, Bryansk Oblast, a settlement under the administrative jurisdiction of Karachev Urban Administrative Okrug in Karachevsky District; 
Krasnaya Polyana, Surazhsky District, Bryansk Oblast, a settlement in Nivnyansky Rural Administrative Okrug of Surazhsky District;

Kabardino-Balkarian Republic
As of 2012, one rural locality in the Kabardino-Balkarian Republic bears this name:
Krasnaya Polyana, Kabardino-Balkarian Republic, a selo in Maysky District;

Kemerovo Oblast
As of 2012, two rural localities in Kemerovo Oblast bear this name:
Krasnaya Polyana, Leninsk-Kuznetsky District, Kemerovo Oblast, a settlement in Demyanovskaya Rural Territory of Leninsk-Kuznetsky District; 
Krasnaya Polyana, Prokopyevsky District, Kemerovo Oblast, a settlement in Safonovskaya Rural Territory of Prokopyevsky District;

Kirov Oblast
As of 2012, two inhabited localities in Kirov Oblast bear this name:

Urban localities
Krasnaya Polyana, Vyatskopolyansky District, Kirov Oblast, an urban-type settlement in Vyatskopolyansky District; 

Rural localities
Krasnaya Polyana, Shabalinsky District, Kirov Oblast, a village in Gostovsky Rural Okrug of Shabalinsky District;

Kostroma Oblast
As of 2012, one rural locality in Kostroma Oblast bears this name:
Krasnaya Polyana, Kostroma Oblast, a settlement in Klevantsovskoye Settlement of Ostrovsky District;

Krasnodar Krai
As of 2012, five inhabited localities in Krasnodar Krai bear this name:

Urban localities
Krasnaya Polyana, Sochi, Krasnodar Krai, an urban-type settlement in Krasnopolyansky Settlement Okrug under the administrative jurisdiction of Adlersky City District under the administrative jurisdiction of the City of Sochi; 

Rural localities
Krasnaya Polyana, Armavir, Krasnodar Krai (also spelled "Krasnaya polyana"), a khutor in Prirechensky Rural Okrug under the administrative jurisdiction of the City of Armavir; 
Krasnaya Polyana, Bryukhovetsky District, Krasnodar Krai, a khutor in Bryukhovetsky Rural Okrug of Bryukhovetsky District; 
Krasnaya Polyana, Gulkevichsky District, Krasnodar Krai, a khutor in Ventsy-Zarya Rural Okrug of Gulkevichsky District; 
Krasnaya Polyana, Kushchyovsky District, Krasnodar Krai, a khutor in Bolshekozinsky Rural Okrug of Kushchyovsky District;

Krasnoyarsk Krai
As of 2012, one rural locality in Krasnoyarsk Krai bears this name:
Krasnaya Polyana, Krasnoyarsk Krai, a selo in Krasnopolyansky Selsoviet of Nazarovsky District

Kursk Oblast
As of 2012, three rural localities in Kursk Oblast bear this name:
Krasnaya Polyana, Cheremisinovsky District, Kursk Oblast, a selo in Cheremisinovsky District
Krasnaya Polyana, Khomutovsky District, Kursk Oblast, a village in Olkhovsky Selsoviet of Khomutovsky District
Krasnaya Polyana, Medvensky District, Kursk Oblast, a khutor in Petrovsky Selsoviet of Medvensky District
Krasnaya Polyana, Oboyansky District, Kursk Oblast, a khutor in Bashkatovsky Selsoviet of Oboyansky District
Krasnaya Polyana, Zolotukhinsky District, Kursk Oblast, a village in Zolotukhinsky District

Lipetsk Oblast
As of 2012, one rural locality in Lipetsk Oblast bears this name:
Krasnaya Polyana, Lipetsk Oblast, a selo in Bolshepolyansky Selsoviet of Terbunsky District;

Mari El Republic
As of 2012, one rural locality in the Mari El Republic bears this name:
Krasnaya Polyana, Mari El Republic, a village in Alexeyevsky Rural Okrug of Sovetsky District Krasnaya Polyana is also in Moskvasky Oblast, taken by Germany, briefly on 30.11.1941, in the Battle of Moscow (Bitya za Moskva).

Republic of Mordovia
As of 2012, five rural localities in the Republic of Mordovia bear this name:
Krasnaya Polyana, Bolshebereznikovsky District, Republic of Mordovia, a settlement in Chernopromzinsky Selsoviet of Bolshebereznikovsky District
Krasnaya Polyana, Insarsky District, Republic of Mordovia, a village in Mordovsko-Payevsky Selsoviet of Insarsky District
Krasnaya Polyana, Kovylkinsky District, Republic of Mordovia, a settlement in Krasnoshadymsky Selsoviet of Kovylkinsky District
Krasnaya Polyana, Staroshaygovsky District, Republic of Mordovia, a settlement in Staroshaygovsky Selsoviet of Staroshaygovsky District
Krasnaya Polyana, Torbeyevsky District, Republic of Mordovia, a village in Khilkovsky Selsoviet of Torbeyevsky District

Nizhny Novgorod Oblast
As of 2012, two rural localities in Nizhny Novgorod Oblast bear this name:
Krasnaya Polyana, Arzamassky District, Nizhny Novgorod Oblast, a village in Chernukhinsky Selsoviet of Arzamassky District
Krasnaya Polyana, Lukoyanovsky District, Nizhny Novgorod Oblast, a selo in Bolshemaresyevsky Selsoviet of Lukoyanovsky District

Omsk Oblast
As of 2012, one rural locality in Omsk Oblast bears this name:
Krasnaya Polyana, Omsk Oblast, a selo in Krasnopolyansky Rural Okrug of Gorkovsky District

Orenburg Oblast
As of 2012, three rural localities in Orenburg Oblast bear this name:
Krasnaya Polyana, Matveyevsky District, Orenburg Oblast, a settlement in Matveyevsky Selsoviet of Matveyevsky District
Krasnaya Polyana, Novosergiyevsky District, Orenburg Oblast, a settlement in Krasnopolyansky Selsoviet of Novosergiyevsky District
Krasnaya Polyana, Orenburgsky District, Orenburg Oblast, a khutor in Sergiyevsky Selsoviet of Orenburgsky District

Oryol Oblast
As of 2012, six rural localities in Oryol Oblast bear this name:
Krasnaya Polyana, Glazunovsky District, Oryol Oblast, a village in Medvedevsky Selsoviet of Glazunovsky District
Krasnaya Polyana, Khotynetsky District, Oryol Oblast, a settlement in Abolmasovsky Selsoviet of Khotynetsky District
Krasnaya Polyana, Kromskoy District, Oryol Oblast, a settlement in Apalkovsky Selsoviet of Kromskoy District
Krasnaya Polyana, Livensky District, Oryol Oblast, a village in Nikolsky Selsoviet of Livensky District
Krasnaya Polyana, Novoderevenkovsky District, Oryol Oblast, a village in Glebovsky Selsoviet of Novoderevenkovsky District
Krasnaya Polyana, Novosilsky District, Oryol Oblast, a settlement in Golunsky Selsoviet of Novosilsky District

Penza Oblast
As of 2012, one rural locality in Penza Oblast bears this name:
Krasnaya Polyana, Penza Oblast, a selo in Rakhmanovsky Selsoviet of Vadinsky District

Rostov Oblast
As of 2012, two rural localities in Rostov Oblast bear this name:
Krasnaya Polyana, Azovsky District, Rostov Oblast, a khutor in Alexandrovskoye Rural Settlement of Azovsky District
Krasnaya Polyana, Peschanokopsky District, Rostov Oblast, a selo in Krasnopolyanskoye Rural Settlement of Peschanokopsky District

Ryazan Oblast
As of 2012, two rural localities in Ryazan Oblast bear this name:
Krasnaya Polyana, Kipchakovsky Rural Okrug, Korablinsky District, Ryazan Oblast, a village in Kipchakovsky Rural Okrug of Korablinsky District
Krasnaya Polyana, Krasnensky Rural Okrug, Korablinsky District, Ryazan Oblast, a village in Krasnensky Rural Okrug of Korablinsky District

Samara Oblast
As of 2012, one rural locality in Samara Oblast bears this name:
Krasnaya Polyana, Samara Oblast, a selo in Pestravsky District

Saratov Oblast
As of 2012, one rural locality in Saratov Oblast bears this name:
Krasnaya Polyana, Saratov Oblast, a selo in Marksovsky District

Stavropol Krai
As of 2012, two rural localities in Stavropol Krai bear this name:
Krasnaya Polyana, Ipatovsky District, Stavropol Krai, a selo in Lesnodachnensky Selsoviet of Ipatovsky District
Krasnaya Polyana, Turkmensky District, Stavropol Krai, a settlement in Ovoshchinsky Selsoviet of Turkmensky District

Sverdlovsk Oblast
As of 2012, one rural locality in Sverdlovsk Oblast bears this name:
Krasnaya Polyana, Sverdlovsk Oblast, a village in Krasnoufimsky District

Tambov Oblast
As of 2012, one rural locality in Tambov Oblast bears this name:
Krasnaya Polyana, Tambov Oblast, a village in Bezukladovsky Selsoviet of Tokaryovsky District

Republic of Tatarstan
As of 2012, two rural localities in the Republic of Tatarstan bear this name:
Krasnaya Polyana, Cheremshansky District, Republic of Tatarstan, a village in Cheremshansky District
Krasnaya Polyana, Tetyushsky District, Republic of Tatarstan, a village in Tetyushsky District

Ulyanovsk Oblast
As of 2012, three rural localities in Ulyanovsk Oblast bear this name:
Krasnaya Polyana, Baryshsky District, Ulyanovsk Oblast, a selo under the administrative jurisdiction of Leninsky Settlement Okrug in Baryshsky District
Krasnaya Polyana, Pavlovsky District, Ulyanovsk Oblast, a village in Shakhovsky Rural Okrug of Pavlovsky District
Krasnaya Polyana, Staromaynsky District, Ulyanovsk Oblast, a settlement in Krasnorechensky Rural Okrug of Staromaynsky District

Voronezh Oblast
As of 2012, one rural locality in Voronezh Oblast bears this name:
Krasnaya Polyana, Voronezh Oblast, a khutor in Rossoshanskoye Rural Settlement of Repyovsky District

Historical localities
Krasnaya Polyana, Moscow Oblast, former village in Moscow Oblast and location of a major action during the Battle of Moscow; now a part of the town of Lobnya

Alternative names
Krasnaya Polyana, alternative name of Polyana, a settlement in Velikotopalsky Rural Administrative Okrug of Klintsovsky District in Bryansk Oblast;